Monomethyl auristatin F (MMAF) is a synthetic antineoplastic agent. It is part of the approved drug belantamab mafodotin in multiple myeloma and some experimental anti-cancer antibody-drug conjugates such as vorsetuzumab mafodotin and SGN-CD19A. In International Nonproprietary Names for MMAF-antibody-conjugates, the name mafodotin refers to MMAF plus its attachment structure to the antibody.

Mechanism of action
Monomethyl auristatin F is an antimitotic agent which inhibits cell division by blocking the polymerisation of tubulin. It is linked to an antibody with high affinity to structures on cancer cells, causing MMAF to accumulate in such cells.

Chemistry
MMAF is actually desmethyl-auristatin F; that is, the N-terminal amino group has only one methyl substituent instead of two as in auristatin F itself.

See also
 Monomethyl auristatin E

References

Mitotic inhibitors
Carboxamides